The European Tour 2013/2014 – Event 5 (also known as the 2013 Ruhr Open) was a professional minor-ranking snooker tournament that took place between 3–6 October 2013 at the RWE-Sporthalle in Mülheim, Germany.

Mark Allen won his fifth professional title by defeating Ding Junhui 4–1 in the final.

Prize fund and ranking points 
The breakdown of prize money and ranking points of the event is shown below:

1 Only professional players can earn ranking points.

Main draw

Preliminary rounds

Round 1 
Best of 7 frames

Round 2 
Best of 7 frames

Round 3 
Best of 7 frames

Main rounds

Top half

Section 1

Section 2

Section 3

Section 4

Bottom half

Section 5

Section 6

Section 7

Section 8

Finals

Century breaks 

 144  Gerard Greene
 139, 120, 100, 100  Mark Allen
 137, 114, 106, 103  David Gilbert
 136  Sam Baird
 132  Ben Harrison
 129, 105  Mark Davis
 126  Luca Brecel
 120  Shaun Murphy
 120  Marco Fu
 119, 105  Ben Woollaston
 118, 106  Ronnie O'Sullivan
 117, 107, 104  Ding Junhui
 115, 100  Judd Trump

 114, 103, 101, 101  Stephen Maguire
 114  Kyren Wilson
 108, 105, 103, 100, 100, 100  Neil Robertson
 107  Rod Lawler
 105  Stuart Bingham
 105  Craig Steadman
 104  Michael White
 103, 100, 100  Chris Norbury
 103  Barry Hawkins
 103  Anthony Hamilton
 100  Barry Pinches
 100  Ricky Walden

References 

2013
ET5
2013 in German sport